M. crocea may refer to:

 Malephora crocea, a flowering plant
 Mantella crocea, a frog endemic to Madagascar
 Maxillaria crocea, a South American orchid
 Mentzelia crocea, an annual wildflower
 Mitra crocea, a sea snail
 Murdannia crocea, a flowering plant
 Mylothris crocea, an African butterfly